Félix Enrique Noguera Collante (born 31 March 1987) is a Colombian footballer who plays as a left back for Atlético Junior in the Categoría Primera A.

References

Living people
1987 births
Colombian footballers
Association football fullbacks
Deportivo Pereira footballers
Independiente Santa Fe footballers
Deportes Tolima footballers
Atlético Junior footballers
Categoría Primera A players
Sportspeople from Magdalena Department
People from Santa Marta